Jakobsbergs GoIF is a sports club in Jakobsberg, Sweden, with handball activity. The men's soccer merged with FC Järfälla in 1993 and the women's soccer did the same thing in 1993.

The club won the Swedish women's soccer national championship in 1977. The club also finished up second in 1975, losing the final game against Öxabäcks IF on penalty kicks.

References

External links
Men's handball team  
Women's handball team 

Defunct football clubs in Sweden
Sport in Stockholm County
Swedish handball clubs
Sport in Uppsala County